Kamilla Rytter Juhl (born 23 November 1983) is a retired Danish badminton player. Juhl is an Olympic silver medalist, World Championship gold medalist and seven times European champion as well.

Career 

Rytter Juhl played as a left-handed doubles specialist.

Juhl enjoyed a successful mixed doubles career with Thomas Laybourn, winning the 2009 BWF World Championships and two European titles in 2006 and 2010. The pair also won the BWF World Superseries Finals in 2008, and won a total of two Superseries titles.

After Laybourn's retirement, Rytter Juhl played mixed doubles with Mads Pieler Kolding, and the pair came runner-up in the 2014 European Championships, losing out to their Danish teammates Christinna Pedersen and Joachim Fischer Nielsen in the final.

In the women's doubles, Juhl initially partnered with Lena Frier Kristiansen, and the pair reached 8th on the world rankings, won a bronze and a gold medal at the European Championships, and reached the World Superseries Finals in 2009.

From 2010 to 2018, Rytter Juhl was paired with Christinna Pedersen. While both athletes also focussed on competing with their respective partners in mixed doubles, in 2016 Juhl changed to competing exclusively in women's doubles. The pair won a silver medal at the 2015 World Championships, and a bronze medal at the 2013 Guangzhou World Championship and at the 2017 BWF World Championships. Rytter Juhl and Pedersen won a total of four European women's doubles titles, one World Superseries Final and five Superseries titles, and had a career highest world ranking of 2nd. Having won seven European titles in total, Rytter Juhl is the most successful Danish player in European Championship history. The pair also won a silver medal at the 2016 Rio Olympics and, in doing so, became the first Europeans to ever compete in an Olympic women's doubles final.

Rytter Juhl represented Skovshoved in the Danish Badminton League and lives in Copenhagen, where she trained with the national team. Off the badminton court, Rytter Juhl has a degree in Sport Management.

She announced her retirement in July 2018, due to her being pregnant, and officially announced her retirement from the BWF World Tour in March 2019 together with Pedersen. The duo journey in badminton will continue in the national tournament.

Personal life
Rytter Juhl is openly lesbian. She gave birth to a daughter named Molly in January 2019.

Rytter Juhl and Christinna Pedersen's autobiography, "Det Unikke Makkerskab" (loosely translated: "The Unique Partnership"), written with support from journalist Rasmus M. Bech, was released in Denmark in October 2017. In the book, the couple tell not only of their lives as international badminton players, but of their life together off court; having been a couple since 2009.

Achievements

Olympic Games 
Women's doubles

BWF World Championships 
Women's doubles

Mixed doubles

European Championships 
Women's doubles

Mixed doubles

BWF World Tour 
The BWF World Tour, which was announced on 19 March 2017 and implemented in 2018, is a series of elite badminton tournaments sanctioned by the Badminton World Federation (BWF). The BWF World Tours are divided into levels of World Tour Finals, Super 1000, Super 750, Super 500, Super 300 (part of the HSBC World Tour), and the BWF Tour Super 100.

Women's doubles

BWF Superseries 
The BWF Superseries, which was launched on 14 December 2006 and implemented in 2007, was a series of elite badminton tournaments, sanctioned by the Badminton World Federation (BWF). BWF Superseries levels were Superseries and Superseries Premier. A season of Superseries consisted of twelve tournaments around the world that had been introduced since 2011. Successful players were invited to the Superseries Finals, which were held at the end of each year.

Women's doubles

Mixed doubles

  BWF Superseries Finals tournament
  BWF Superseries Premier tournament
  BWF Superseries tournament

BWF Grand Prix 
The BWF Grand Prix had two levels, the Grand Prix and Grand Prix Gold. It was a series of badminton tournaments sanctioned by the Badminton World Federation (BWF) and played between 2007 and 2017. The World Badminton Grand Prix was sanctioned by the International Badminton Federation from 1983 to 2006.

Women's doubles

Mixed doubles

 BWF Grand Prix Gold tournament
 BWF & IBF Grand Prix tournament

BWF International Challenge/Series 
Women's doubles

Mixed doubles

  BWF International Challenge tournament
  BWF International Series tournament

Record Against Top Opponents 
Women's doubles results with Christinna Pedersen against Super Series finalists, Worlds Semi-finalists, and Olympic quarterfinalists, as well as all Olympic opponents.

 / Petya Nedelcheva & Anastasia Russkikh 0–1
  Ma Jin & Tang Jinhua 1–3
  Wang Xiaoli & Yu Yang 1–6
  Tian Qing & Zhao Yunlei 4–10
  Bao Yixin & Zhong Qianxin 2–1
  Bao Yixin & Tang Jinhua 0–3
  Bao Yixin & Ma Jin 0–2
  Ou Dongni & Tang Yuanting 1–1
  Bao Yixin & Tian Qing 0–2
  Luo Ying & Luo Yu 2–3
  Ma Jin & Tang Yuanting 1–3
  Tang Yuanting & Yu Yang 1–1
  Cheng Wen-hsing & Chien Yu-chin 1–1
  Poon Lok Yan & Tse Ying Suet 4–1
  Jwala Gutta & Ashwini Ponnappa 2–0
  Mizuki Fujii & Reika Kakiiwa 3–2
  Miyuki Maeda & Satoko Suetsuna 3–3
  Shizuka Matsuo & Mami Naito 5–2
  Misaki Matsutomo & Ayaka Takahashi 6–10
  Reika Kakiiwa & Miyuki Maeda 3–0
  Jung Kyung-eun & Kim Ha-na 4–3
  Ha Jung-eun & Kim Min-jung 1–4
  Jung Kyung-eun & Shin Seung-chan 2–1
  Chang Ye-na & Lee So-hee 1–2
  Chin Eei Hui & Wong Pei Tty 1–1
  Valeria Sorokina & Nina Vislova 2–0
  Duanganong Aroonkesorn & Kunchala Voravichitchaikul 4–0
  Eva Lee & Paula Lynn Obanana 3–0

References

External links 
 
 
 
 Kamilla Rytter Juhl at Badminton.dk
 

1983 births
Living people
People from Skagen
Danish female badminton players
Badminton players at the 2008 Summer Olympics
Badminton players at the 2012 Summer Olympics
Badminton players at the 2016 Summer Olympics
Olympic badminton players of Denmark
Olympic silver medalists for Denmark
Olympic medalists in badminton
Medalists at the 2016 Summer Olympics
World No. 1 badminton players
Danish LGBT sportspeople
Danish lesbians
Lesbian sportswomen
LGBT badminton players
Sportspeople from the North Jutland Region